Nagalpur Moti  or Nagalpar Moti is a small village in Kutch district in the state of Gujarat, India. It comes under Anjar taluka.

History
About history of Nagalpar or Nagalpur it is one of the 19 villages established by Kutch Gurjar Kshatriyas or Mistris as they are known in Kutch in the 12th century.

All the old houses, temples and early infrastructure is built by these Mistri - Gurjar Kshatriya community during 1890-1900. However, majority of old houses with unique architect were destroyed 
in the earthquake of 26 January 2001.but still it could be hardly seen at some places of nagalpur

Temples

Thakor Mandir dedicated to Vishnu and Laxmi having beautiful carvings at Nagalpar was built by Lira Valji Tank in 1900. Also there is a Shiva temple, which was also built around 1900.

Kuldevi Temples of many clans of these Kutch Gurjar Kshatriya community are also there in this village. For example, Jethwa clan have their Kuldevi Brahmani - Chamunda Mata's temple in village.

Dargah
Mistri Ruda Gova Rathod of Khedoi was the Gaidher, who constructed in Nagalpar, the beautifully carved Dargah of Hussain Pir Shah also known as the Aga Khani Kubo of Khoja community, which was inaugurated by Hasan Ali Shah, the Aga Khan I him-self. Ruda Gova Rathod of Khedoi started construction in the year 1860 and completed in about five years by 1865 and Roza Mubarak of Abul- Fazlil  Abbas which is situated in the main bazar of nagalpur and was constructed in 2009 and it is one of the most important place for shias and the shia ishnashari masjid too, every year a possession is taken  on the holy day of muharram where the people of shia community perform the Zanjir's matam and celebrates the mourning of imam Hussain, the brother of abul-Fazlil Abbas

References

Villages in Kutch district